Trinemeia was a deme of ancient Attica at which one of the minor branches of the Cephissus takes its rise.

Trinemeia's site is tentatively located near modern Kokkinaras.

References

Populated places in ancient Attica
Former populated places in Greece
Demoi